Anapa Urban Okrug is a municipal formation (an urban okrug) in Krasnodar Krai, Russia, one of the seven urban okrugs in the krai. Its territory comprises the territories of two administrative divisions of Krasnodar Krai — Anapsky District and the Town of Anapa.

The municipal formation was established on September 16, 1996. Urban okrug status was granted to it by the Law of Krasnodar Krai #676-KZ of April 1, 2004.

References

Notes

Sources

External links

 

Urban okrugs of Krasnodar Krai
States and territories established in 1996